The 2011 EmblemHealth Bronx Open was a professional tennis tournament played on hard courts. It was the 12th edition of the tournament which is part of the 2011 ITF Women's Circuit. It took place in The Bronx, United States between 8 and 14 August 2011.

WTA entrants

Seeds

 1 Rankings are as of August 1, 2011.

Other entrants
The following players received wildcards into the singles main draw:
  Madison Brengle
  Lauren Embree
  Ester Goldfeld
  Amanda McDowell

The following players received entry from the qualifying draw:
  Yaroslava Shvedova
  Elena Bovina
  Tamaryn Hendler
  Ahsha Rolle

Champions

Singles

 Andrea Hlaváčková def.  Mona Barthel, 7–6(10–8), 6–3

Doubles

 Megan Moulton-Levy /  Ahsha Rolle def.  Han Xinyun /  Lu Jingjing, 6–3, 7–6(7–5)

External links
Official Website
ITF Search 

EmblemHealth Bronx Open
EmblemHealth Bronx Open
EmblemHealth Bronx Open
2010s in the Bronx
EmblemHealth Bronx Open
Hard court tennis tournaments in the United States
Sports competitions in New York City
Sports in the Bronx
Tennis tournaments in New York City